Home and Abroad (styled Live! The Style Council, Home & Abroad. on its cover) is a live album by the English band The Style Council, released in 1986. It was recorded on the tour supporting the band's 1985 album Our Favourite Shop.

It is their first non-studio album and their only live album until 1998's In Concert. As was common at the time, the CD and cassette versions of the album featured two songs that did not appear on the LP. The album cover shows both Paul Weller and Mick Talbot sitting on a stool, although both Dee C. Lee and Steve White appear on the album.

Reviewing the album, AllMusic's Stephen Thomas Erlewine wrote: "Home & Abroad is a slick and earnest live set, but it's only of interest to die-hard Paul Weller fans."

Track listing
 "The Big Boss Groove"
 "My Ever Changing Moods"
 "The Lodgers"
 "Headstart for Happiness"
 "(When You) Call Me"
 "The Whole Point of No Return"
 "Our Favourite Shop"
 "With Everything to Lose"
 "Homebreakers"
 "Shout to the Top!"
 "Walls Come Tumbling Down!"
 "Internationalists"

Tracks 1 and 7 did not appear on the vinyl album.

Personnel
The Style Council
 Paul Weller – vocals, guitar
 Mick Talbot – keyboards
 Dee C. Lee – vocals
 Steve White – drums

Charts

Certifications

References

External links
 

1986 live albums
The Style Council albums
Polydor Records albums